The 2019–20 V-League season was the 16th season of the V-League, the highest professional volleyball league in South Korea. The season started in October 2019 but was postponed and then cancelled in March 2020 during Round Six because of the outbreak of the coronavirus.

Teams

Men's clubs

Women's clubs

Season standing procedure 
 Match points
 Number of matches won
 Sets ratio
 Points ratio
 Result of the last match between the tied teams

 In the men's league, if the 4th-placed team finishes within three points of the 3rd placed team, an extra league game is played between these two teams.

Match won 3–0 or 3–1: 3 match points for the winner, 0 match points for the loser
Match won 3–2: 2 match points for the winner, 1 match point for the loser

Regular season

League table (Men's) 

Source: League table (Men's)

League table (Women's) 

Source: League table (Women's)

Results / Fixtures - Male

Rounds 1 and 2 

 = game played at away team's ground

Rounds 3 and 4

Rounds 5 and 6 

 = game played at away team's ground
Season postponed from March 2, and then cancelled on March 23rd due to coronavirus. 

Source: Game Schedule (Men's)

Results / Fixtures - Female

Rounds 1 and 2 

 = game played at away team's ground

Rounds 3 and 4 

 = game played at away team's ground

Rounds 5 and 6 

Season postponed from March 2, and then cancelled on March 23 due to coronavirus.

...

Source: Game Schedule (Women's)

Attendance

Men's teams

Women's teams

Top Scorers

Men's

Women's

Player of the Round

Men's

Women's

Final standing

Men's League 

 Final placing given based on league position at time of cancellation, but no title or prize money awarded.

Women's League

References

External links
 Official website 

2019 in volleyball
2020 in volleyball
V-League (South Korea)
V-League